Blue Vertigo is a recording by guitarist Preston Reed, released in 1990.

Blue Vertigo marks the first instance of Reed's initiation of his percussive, two-hand tapping guitar style. The first song he composed in this style is "Slap Funk". It is also noteworthy that this recording includes the only cover version Reed had recorded - "I Got You (I Feel Good)" by soul singer James Brown - until his 2007 release Spirit included "All The Things You Are", written by Jerome Kern.

Blue Vertigo is out of print.

Track listing
All songs by Preston Reed except as noted.
 "Slap Funk"
 "7/4"
 "No Problem"
 "Drums"
 "Micronesia"
 "Blue Vertigo"
 "Driving School"
 "TV Kid"
 "Your Picture Here"
 "Franzl's Saw, Parts 1 and 2"
 "I Got You (I Feel Good)" (James Brown)
 "Warm Up Song"

Personnel
Preston Reed - 6 & 12-string acoustic guitars

Production notes
Produced by Preston Reed
Engineered by Tom Mudge and Craig Thorson, assisted by Mike McCall-Pangra

References

1990 albums
Preston Reed albums
MCA Records albums